Wagimo signata is a butterfly of the family Lycaenidae. It was described by Arthur Gardiner Butler in 1881. It is found in the Russian Far East (Ussuri, Primor'e), north-eastern and central China, Korea and Japan.

Adults hatch in the middle of July.

The larvae feed on Quercus species (including Q. dentata, Q. serrata, Q. mongolica, Q. acutissima, Q. alinea and Q. variabilis), as well as Cyclobalanospsis glauca. The larva of the first instar bores into the bud. Later intars feed on flowers and fresh leaves. Pupation takes place inside a shelter which the larva nibble out of the bark.

Subspecies
Wagimo signata signata
Wagimo signata minamii (Fujioka, 1994)
Wagimo signata quercivora (Staudinger, 1887) (southern Ussuri)

References

 "Wagimo signata (Butler, 1882)" at Insecta.pro

Butterflies described in 1881
Theclini
Taxa named by Arthur Gardiner Butler
Butterflies of Asia